Manikrao Hodlya Gavit (29 October 1934 – 17 September 2022) was an Indian politician from Nandurbar district of Maharashtra, India. A member of the Indian National Congress (INC), he represented the Nandurbar constituency from 1980 to 2014, winning the Indian general elections consecutive nine times, marking a record.

Gavit served as a member of the 7th, 8th, 9th, 10th, 11th, 12th, 13th and 14th Lok Sabha. In his 14th parliamentary term, he was Minister of State in the Ministry of Home Affairs in the Manmohan Singh government until 6 April 2008, when he was asked to resign. He alleged that Indian National Congress President Sonia Gandhi told him that she was under pressure to remove him. He was elected for the consecutive ninth time from the Nandurbar constituency in the 2009 Indian general election.

Gavit had been appointed a pro-tem speaker of 15th Lok Sabha by President Pratibha Patil. As pro-tem speaker, he performed the Speaker's duties until the election of a new Speaker of the Lok Sabha. He served as Minister of State for the Social Justice department.

Positions held

Following were some of the political affiliations and representations of Manikrao Gavit.

 1965-71	Member, Navapur Village Panchayat, District. Dhule, Maharashtra
 1971-78	Chairman, Social Welfare Committee, Zila Parishad, Dhule, Maharashtra
 1978-84	Vice-President, District Congress Committee (Indira) [D.C.C.(I)], District. Dhule, Maharashtra
 1980-81	Member, Maharashtra Legislative Assembly; Chairman, Committee on Social Welfare
 1981 Elected to the 7th Lok Sabha
 1984	Re-elected to the 8th Lok Sabha (2nd term)
 1989	Re-elected to the 9th Lok Sabha (3rd term)
 1990-91	Member, Committee on Absence of Members from the Sittings of the House
 1990-96	Member, Consultative Committee, Ministry of Petroleum and Chemicals
 1991	Re-elected to the 10th Lok Sabha (4th term)
 1991-93	Member, Consultative Committee, Ministry of Railways (two terms)
 1996	Re-elected to the 11th Lok Sabha (5th term)
 1998	Re-elected to 12th Lok Sabha (6th term)
 1998-99	Member, Committee on Labour and Welfare
 Member, Consultative Committee, Ministry of Petroleum and Natural Gas
 1999	Re-elected to the 13th Lok Sabha (7th term)
 1999-2000	Member, Committee on Absence of Members from the Sittings of the House
 Member, Committee on Railways
 1999-2001	Member, Committee on the Welfare of Scheduled Castes and Scheduled Tribes
 2000-2004	Member, Consultative Committee, Ministry of Petroleum and Natural Gas
 2004	Re-elected to the 14th Lok Sabha (8th term)
 23 May 2004	Union Minister of State, Home Affairs
 2009	Re-elected to the 15th Lok Sabha (9th term)
 1 June 2009	Pro-tem Speaker
 31 August 2009	Member, Committee on Rural Development
 7 October 2009	Chairman, Committee on Ethics  
 22 July 2013	Minister of State for Social Justice & Empowerment.

In the 2014 general elections, Manikrao Gavit lost the Nandurbar seat to Heena Gavit by a margin of 106,905 votes.

References

External links

 Official biographical sketch in Parliament of India website

1934 births
2022 deaths
Indian National Congress politicians
People from Maharashtra
People from Nandurbar district
Marathi politicians
India MPs 1980–1984
India MPs 1984–1989
India MPs 1989–1991
India MPs 1991–1996
India MPs 1996–1997
India MPs 1998–1999
India MPs 1999–2004
India MPs 2004–2009
India MPs 2009–2014
Lok Sabha members from Maharashtra
Pro tem Speakers of the Lok Sabha
Bharatiya Janata Party politicians from Maharashtra